Flying Rhino Junior High is an animated television series produced by Neurones Animation, Nelvana Limited, and Scottish Television Enterprises. The show was originally aired from 3 October 1998 until 22 January 2000 on Teletoon in Canada. In the U.S., the show was aired on CBS (part of the CBS Kidshow block). On 2 February 2000, the show was cancelled.

Plot
The show revolves around four children: Billy O' Toole, Marcus Snarkis, Ruby Snarkis, and Lydia Lopez. The show's main antagonists are Earl P. Sidebottom (also known as The Phantom) and his rat sidekick, Ratticus. Earl is a boy genius who, sometime before the show's beginning, got a "D" grade in shop class and retreated to the school's sub-basement boiler room in shame. There, he built a supercomputer capable of altering reality, which he uses to cause chaos in the school as revenge, leaving the main group to stop him.

Characters
Ashley Brown as the voice of Billy O'Toole – An Irish-Canadian boy and the main protagonist of the show. He wears a red baseball cap with a "B" on it because he plays baseball. He dislikes taking baths because he thinks they are boring without his imagination.
Tracey Moore as the voice of Marcus Snarkis – a Black Canadian boy who is Billy's best friend and classmate. Marcus has a great knowledge of computers and carries around a mini-computer called a Megamind, which helps him solve problems. He is Ruby's younger brother.
Tracy Ryan as the voice of Ruby Snarkis – Marcus's older sister. She is sometimes hot-headed, but still cares for her friends and Marcus. Her goal in life is to become an actress.
Terri Hawkes as the voice of Lydia Lopez – A girl of Latin-Canadian descent who is one of Billy's classmates. She is a redhead who wears braces. She is often shown wearing a polka-dotted blue dress with striped purple tights and blue shoes, and her hair is done in pigtails. She is considered the smartest girl in her class, even by Earl's standards. Lydia is one of the brains of the main group, as her knowledge helps them escape Earl's traps.
Richard Binsley as the voice of The Phantom/Earl P. Sidebottom – Earl is the antagonist of the show. He is the boy genius who, in his past, got a bad grade in shop class and went to the boiler-room in shame. His personality is that of an evil genius; however, the downside is that he is also very childish. He builds a giant supercomputer which alters reality and, depending on the theme of each episode, the computer can alter the appearance of the school. However, most of Earl's schemes normally backfire mainly thanks to the kids, and mostly end with the destruction of the computer. He prefers being called "The Phantom", but he doesn't mind having the main group call him by his real name.
Ron Rubin as the voice of Raticus – The Phantom's bumbling pet rat who carries out his schemes. Raticus is not very bright, and he is often insulted and treated badly by Earl due to his lack of intelligence.
Edward Glen as the voice of Fred Spurtz – The school pig. He likes eating bugs and fish. He normally hangs out with the main group of characters.
Lindsay Leese as the voice of Mrs. Snodgrass – The children's teacher. She is very caring about the students in her class and always makes sure they follow her rules. She often uses The Phantom's school shifting schemes to help teach the class.
Len Carlson as the voice of Principal Buzz Mulligan – The principal of Flying Rhino Junior High. He is in fact an anthropomorphic rhinoceros. He is normally oblivious to anything odd going on in the school; however, he is portrayed as a caring, respectable administrator. He also appears to be a retired ace pilot. Hence, the school's name.
Paul Haddad as the voice of Buford – The janitor of Flying Rhino Junior High. He is an anthropomorphic pig, similar to how Principal Mulligan is an anthropomorphic rhino. He sees himself as a secret agent and sometimes helps the protagonists through situations, whether or not they're caused by Earl.
Eddie Glen as the voice of Johnny Descunk – A troubled classmate of the main group who sometimes gets sent to detention, and hangs out with the other kids.
Ron Rubin as the voice of Rod Hargrove – Rod is Johnny's best friend. He happens to be as bright as Raticus.
Catherine Gallant (Julie Lemieux in Season 2) as the voice of Nurse Cutlip – Flying Rhino Junior High's school nurse.
Paul Haddad as the voice of Mr. Needlenose – The drama teacher and former shop teacher who gave Earl his failing grade.

Episodes

Season 1 (1998)

Season 2 (1999–2000)

Telecast and home media
The show was originally aired on Teletoon in Canada from 3 October 1998 until the final episode aired on 22 January 2000. Repeats were formerly aired on YTV in the 2000s until the early 2010s. Internationally, the show is aired on CBS (part of the "CBS Kidshow" block) in the U.S., Cartoon Network in the Netherlands, CITV in the United Kingdom, TF1 in France, Super RTL in Germany, Nickelodeon and HBO Family in the Latin America, Top Kids in Poland, Rai 3 in Italy, and ABC 5 in Philippines. In 1999, the show has been released on VHS by Alliance Atlantis. As of 2022, the show is now streaming on Tubi.

Cancellation 
On 2 February 2000, US network CBS announced that they had cancelled the show on 22 January 2000.

References

External links
 
 Flying Rhino Junior High on STV Player
 Official Nelvana site

1990s Canadian animated television series
1990s French animated television series
1998 Canadian television series debuts
1998 French television series debuts
2000 Canadian television series endings
2000s Canadian animated television series
2000 French television series endings
2000s French animated television series
Animated television series about children
Canadian children's animated science fantasy television series
CBS original programming
English-language television shows
French children's animated science fantasy television series
ITV children's television shows
Teletoon original programming
Television series by Nelvana
Television series by STV Studios
Fictional schools
Middle school television series